Keith E. Caywood (February 19, 1919 – October 20, 1992) was an American football coach.  He served as the 14th head football coach at Kansas State Teachers College—now known as Emporia State University—in Emporia, Kansas and held that position for 12 seasons, from 1955 until 1966, compiling a record of 24–80–5. Caywood was the backfield coach at Emporia State under Fran Welch from 1946 to 1954.

Caywood died at Las Cruces, New Mexico in 1992.

Head coaching record

References

External links
 

1992 deaths
1919 births
American football halfbacks
Emporia State Hornets football coaches
Emporia State Hornets football players
Fort Riley Centaurs football players